Gela Saghirashvili (born November 7, 1980) is a male freestyle wrestler from Georgia. He participated in Men's freestyle 74 kg at 2008 Summer Olympics. After beating Augusto Midana he lost with Murad Gaidarov and was eliminated from competition.

He participated as well in Men's freestyle 74 kg at 2004 Summer Olympics where he was ranked in 14th place.

External links
 Wrestler bio on nbcolympics.com

Living people
1980 births
Olympic wrestlers of Georgia (country)
Wrestlers at the 2008 Summer Olympics
Wrestlers at the 2004 Summer Olympics
Male sport wrestlers from Georgia (country)